Bodakajtor is part of Aba in the Subregion of Aba, Fejér County, Hungary. It lies 5 kilometer North West from the center of the village. There is a community house in this part of the village.

Demographics 
There were 82 housing buildings in Bodakajtor where 371 people lived in 2011.

References

Populated places in Fejér County